The 1996 ITC Helsinki round was the fourth round of the 1996 International Touring Car Championship season. It took place on 9 June at the Helsinki Thunder.

Hans-Joachim Stuck won both races, driving an Opel Calibra V6 4x4.

Classification

Qualifying

Race 1

Race 2

Notes:
 – Alexander Wurz was given a 40-second penalty for causing a collision with Ellen Lohr.

Standings after the event

Drivers' Championship standings

Manufacturers' Championship standings

 Note: Only the top five positions are included for both sets of drivers' standings.

References

External links
Deutsche Tourenwagen Masters official website

1996 International Touring Car Championship season